This is a list of people who have served as Lord-Lieutenant of Mayo.

There were lieutenants of counties in Ireland until the reign of James II, when they were renamed governors. The office of Lord Lieutenant was recreated on 23 August 1831.

Governors

 James O'Hara, 2nd Baron Tyrawley: –1774
 John Browne, 1st Earl of Altamont: 1774–1776
 Charles Bingham, 1st Earl of Lucan: 1776–
 John Browne, 1st Baron Kilmaine: –1794
 John Browne, 1st Marquess of Sligo 1779–1808
 Arthur Gore, 2nd Earl of Arran: 1794–1809
 James Cuffe, 1st Baron Tyrawley: 1778?–1821
 Charles Dillon, 12th Viscount Dillon: 1809–1813
 James Cuffe: 1818–1828
 James Caulfeild Browne, 2nd Baron Kilmaine: 1821–1825
 Dominick Geoffrey Browne: –1831
 Howe Browne, 2nd Marquess of Sligo: –1831

Lord Lieutenants
 The 2nd Marquess of Sligo: 7 October 1831 – 26 January 1845
 Field Marshal The 3rd Earl of Lucan: 25 February 1845 – 10 November 1888
 The 5th Earl of Arran: 14 January 1889 – 14 March 1901
 The 4th Earl of Lucan: 27 July 1901 – 5 June 1914
 The 6th Marquess of Sligo: 1 September 1914 – 1922

References

Mayo